Lehner is a surname.  It derives from the Middle High German verb lehen "to hold land as a feudal tenant", and was once used to indicate a person's status as a land-holder.

Persons with this surname include:

 Christine Lehner (born 1952), American novelist and short story writer
 Ernst Lehner (1912–1986), German footballer
 Eugene Lehner (1906–1997), Hungarian violist and music educator
 Gerald Lehner (born 1963), Austrian journalist and author
 Gerald Lehner (born 1968),  Austrian football referee
 Helmuth Lehner (born 1968), Austrian metal musician
 Hugo Lehner (1902–1952), Swiss alpine guide and skier
 Joseph Lehner (1912–2013), American mathematician
 Mark Lehner, American archaeologist
 Otto Lehner (1898–1977), Swiss cyclist
 Paul Lehner (1920–1967), American baseball outfielder
 Peggy Lehner, American politician (Republican Party)
 Peter Lehner (born 1958), American lawyer and environmentalist
 Robin Lehner (born 1991), Swedish ice hockey goaltender
 Stefan Lehner (born 1957), Swiss designer
 Wilhelm Lehner (1914–2012), German military officer

References

See also 
 Lechner (a variant)

German-language surnames